This is a list of String quintets by Wolfgang Amadeus Mozart.  All are "viola quintets" meaning that they are all scored for string quartet and an extra viola (two violins, two violas and cello).

 String Quintet No. 1 in B flat major, K. 174
 String Quintet No. 2 in C minor, K. 406/516b
 String Quintet No. 3 in C major, K. 515
 String Quintet No. 4 in G minor, K. 516
 String Quintet No. 5 in D major, K. 593
 String Quintet No. 6 in E-flat major, K. 614

 
String quartets